"You Can't Fall in Love When You're Cryin'" is a song written and recorded by American country music artist Lee Greenwood.  It was released in August 1988 as the second single from the album This Is My Country.  The song reached #20 on the Billboard Hot Country Singles & Tracks chart.

Chart performance

References

1988 singles
Lee Greenwood songs
Song recordings produced by Jimmy Bowen
MCA Records singles
1988 songs
Songs written by Lee Greenwood